The 2011–12 season of the Hoofdklasse is competed in six leagues, three Saturday leagues and three Sunday leagues. The champions of each group promoted direct to the 2012–13 Topklasse.

Teams

Saturday A

Saturday B

Saturday C

Sunday A

Sunday B

Sunday C

League tables

Saturday A

Saturday B

Saturday C

Championship play-off 
In determining which team becomes champion, only the achieved number of points is considered. The goal difference is completely ignored.
Therefore, WHC and DETO were considered to have ended equal and had to play an additional match against each other on neutral ground in Hardenberg to decide which team would become champion and which team would have to play the promotion/relegation Topklasse/Hoofdklasse play-offs.

Source:

Sunday A

Sunday B

Relegation play-off 
In determining which teams relegate directly and which teams are allowed to play the play-offs to avoid relegation, only the achieved number of points is considered. The goal difference is initially completely ignored.
Therefore, Meerssen, de Valk and Dijkse Boys were considered to have ended equal and had to play a play-off to decide which 2 teams were allowed to enter the promotion/relegation Hoofdklasse/Eerste Klasse play-offs. The play-off is a semi competition in which each team plays one match at home and one match away. If two or more teams end with the same number of points not the goal difference of the play-off but the goal difference of the regular season determines the final ranking.

Sunday C

Promotion/relegation play-off Topklasse – Hoofdklasse

First round 
The 3 period winners of each league are grouped together and play a semi-competition to decide which of the three continues to the second round. Each team plays one match at home and one match away.

Saturday A

Saturday B

Saturday C

Sunday A

Sunday B

Sunday C

Second and Final round 
The 3 remaining teams from the Saturday leagues and the team ranked 13th in the 2012–13 Topklasse Saturday league play in a knock-out system for 1 spot in the 2012–13 Topklasse Saturday league.
Likewise, the 3 remaining teams from the Sunday leagues and the team ranked 13th in the 2012–13 Topklasse Sunday league play in a knock-out system for 1 spot in the 2012–13 Topklasse Sunday league.
For details and results see 2011-12 Topklasse Promotion/relegation play-offs.

Promotion/relegation play-off Hoofdklasse – Eerste Klasse

Saturday 
The teams ranked 11th and 12th of each of the 3 Saturday leagues (6 teams) and the 3 period winners of each of the 5 Saturday Eerste Klasse leagues (15 teams), making a total of 21 teams are grouped in 7 groups of 3 teams in  such a way that the Hoofdklasse teams each end up in a different group. In each group the 3 teams play a semi-competition in such a way that each team plays one match at home and one match away.
The 7 group winners will play next season in the 2012–13 Hoofdklasse and the remaining teams in the 2012–13 Eerste klasse.

Group 1

Group 2

Groep 3

Groep 4

Group 5

Group 6

Group 7

Sunday 
The teams ranked 11th and 12th of each of the 3 Sunday leagues (6 teams) and the 3 period winners of each of the 6 Sunday Eerste Klasse leagues (18 teams), making a total of 24 teams, play in a 2-round 2 leg knockout system in such a way that the Hoofdklasse teams can never meet each other.
The 6 winners of the second round matches will play next season in the 2012–13 Hoofdklasse and the remaining teams in the 2012–13 Eerste klasse.

Sources:

References 

 www.knvb.nl

2011-12
Neth
4